W. "Billy" Wilson was a college football player. He was a prominent running back and end for coach John Heisman's Georgia Tech Yellow Jackets of the Georgia Institute of Technology, selected All-Southern in 1904. He was captain-elect of 1906.

References

Year of birth missing
Year of death missing
People from Hampton, Georgia
Players of American football from Georgia (U.S. state)
Sportspeople from the Atlanta metropolitan area
American football halfbacks
American football fullbacks
Georgia Tech Yellow Jackets football players
All-Southern college football players